"Origo" (English: Origin) is a song written and performed by Hungarian singer and rapper Joci Pápai. The song was released as a digital download on 4 January 2017 through Magneoton. It represented Hungary in the Eurovision Song Contest 2017.

Eurovision Song Contest

On 8 December 2016, Pápai was announced as one of the competitors in A Dal 2017, Hungary's national selection for the Eurovision Song Contest 2017. He advanced from the third heat on 4 February 2017, and the first semi-final on 10 February, to the final, held on 18 February, where he was declared the winner. Pápai competed in the first half of the second semi-final at the Eurovision Song Contest on 11 May 2017 and was subsequently qualified for the Grand Final.

Track listing

Charts

Release history

References

Eurovision songs of Hungary
Eurovision songs of 2017
2016 songs
2017 singles
Joci Pápai songs